Junta is a former settlement in Summers County, West Virginia, United States. Junta was located on the New River, west of Indian Mills, but no trace of the town remains. Junta appeared on maps as late as 1924.

Junta is a name derived from Spanish.

References

Geography of Summers County, West Virginia
Ghost towns in West Virginia